Irish Eyes Are Smiling is a 1944 United States musical film which chronicles the life of popular Irish song composer Ernest R. Ball. The screenplay by Earl Baldwin and John Tucker Battle is based on a story by E. A. Ellington. The film was directed by Gregory Ratoff, and produced by Damon Runyon for 20th Century Fox. The film was nominated for the Academy Award for Best Original Score in 1944.

Plot
The movie is a musical account of the life of Ernest R. Ball, a gifted composer of many popular Irish songs, including the titular one.

Cast
Monty Woolley ... Edgar Brawley
June Haver ... Mary "Irish" O'Neill
Dick Haymes ... Ernest R. Ball
Anthony Quinn ... Al Jackson
Beverly Whitney ... Lucille Lacey
Maxie Rosenbloom ... Stanley Ketchel
Veda Ann Borg ... Belle La Tour
Clarence Kolb ... Leo Betz
Leonard Warren ... Opera Singer
Blanche Thebom ... Opera Singer
Chick Chandler ... Stage Manager
 Muriel Page... Specialty Dancer
Kenny Williams ... Specialty Dancer 
Michael Dalmatoff ... Headwaiter

Radio adaptation
Irish Eyes Are Smiling was presented on Lux Radio Theatre March 15, 1948. Haymes reprised his role from the movie in the adaptation.

References

External links

1944 musical films
1944 films
American musical films
Films directed by Gregory Ratoff
Films scored by Alfred Newman
20th Century Fox films
1940s American films